Mark Alun Jones (born 22 June 1965) is a Welsh dual-code international professional rugby union and rugby league rugby player who played in the 1980s and 1990s.

Background
Mark Jones was born in Tredegar, Wales. He signed for Hull FC from Neath RFC in October 1990 in a five-year deal worth about £120,000. He signed for Warrington from Hull F.C. on 3 July 1995. He was sold to Ebbw Vale RFC for a nominal fee in September 1996.

International honours
Mark Jones won caps for Wales (RU) while at Neath in 1987 against Scotland, in 1988 against New Zealand (interchange/substitute), in 1989 against Scotland, Ireland, France, England, and New Zealand, in 1990 against France, England, Scotland, Ireland, and Namibia (2 matches), and while at Warrington in 1998 against Zimbabwe, won caps for Wales (RL) while at Hull in 1991 against Papua New Guinea, in 1992 against France, and England, in 1993 against New Zealand, in 1994 against France, and while at Warrington in 1995 against USA (two spells), in the 1995 Rugby League World Cup against France (interchange/substitute), and England (interchange/substitute), in 1996 against France, and England, and won a cap for Great Britain (RL) while at Hull in 1992 against France (interchange/substitute).

References

External links
Warrington's World Cup heroes – Mark Jones
Statistics at wolvesplayers.thisiswarrington.co.uk

1965 births
Living people
Aberavon RFC players
Dual-code rugby internationals
Ebbw Vale RFC players
Great Britain national rugby league team players
Hull F.C. players
Neath RFC players
Pontypool RFC players
Rugby league players from Tredegar
Rugby league props
Rugby league second-rows
Rugby union flankers
Rugby union number eights
Rugby union players from Tredegar
Tredegar Ironsides RFC players
Tredegar RFC players
Wales international rugby union players
Wales national rugby league team players
Warrington Wolves players
Welsh rugby league players
Welsh rugby union players